Carl Richard Badendyck (born in 1942) is a Norwegian Jazz singer and pianist, that in his time was strong in Decathlon.

Biography 
Badendyck has released three solo albums, That’s All (2005), Peace (2010) and Lover (2015), and it is on time for a Norwegian male voice on the jazz scene again. The second album Peace containing American standards and with his son Dag Richard Badendyck as pianist on a song, got good reception in the media. The latest album with songs from «The American Songbook» with strings arranged by Odd Riisnæs who also plays saxophone, while Stig Hvalryg playing upright bass and Sigmund Thorp conducting the string orchestra. There are for the most standards, except Badendycks own tune, "Lover". It has been done with respect for the masters, and sounds much more robust than for example Kurt Elling and Gregory Porter, or for that matter Jimmy Scott.

Discography 
 2004: That's All (Jazzavdelingen)
 2010: Peace (BadenMusic), with Stig Hvalryg
 2015: Lover (BadenMusic), with Stig Hvalryg and Odd Riisnæs

References

External links 
 En veteran vender tilbake bloggpost av Tor Hammerø 

1942 births
Norwegian jazz pianists
Norwegian male composers
20th-century Norwegian male singers
20th-century Norwegian singers
People from Vestfold
Living people
Norwegian male pianists
21st-century pianists
Male jazz musicians